Maximiliano Vallejo (born 24 April 1982) is an Argentine professional football player currently playing for Nacional Potosí in the Liga de Fútbol Profesional Boliviano.

Career
Prior to moving to Iran in 2010, Vallejo played for Club Atlético Independiente however without making a single appearance in the Argentine Primera División, then top league side C.A. Cerro from Uruguay, Persela Lamongan in the Indonesia Super League, FK Budućnost Podgorica in the Montenegrin First League and Bella Vista de Bahía Blanca playing in Torneo Argentino B.

References

External sources
 Profile at Persianleague
 Profile at Playerhistory 
 Profile at Ligaindonesia

1982 births
Living people
Footballers from Buenos Aires
Argentine footballers
Argentine expatriate footballers
Association football forwards
Argentine Primera División players
Club Atlético Independiente footballers
C.A. Cerro players
Expatriate footballers in Uruguay
Persela Lamongan players
Expatriate footballers in Indonesia
FK Budućnost Podgorica players
Expatriate footballers in Montenegro
Shahrdari Bandar Abbas players
Expatriate footballers in Iran
Bella Vista de Bahía Blanca footballers